John McClelland may refer to:

 John McClelland (doctor) (1805–1883), British medical doctor and naturalist
 John McClelland (footballer, born 1935), English football outside-right
 John McClelland (footballer, born 1955), Northern Ireland international football defender
 John McClelland (businessman), former Chairman of Rangers F.C.
 John McClelland (soldier) (1766–1849), officer in the War of 1812, son of John B. McClelland
 John A. McClelland, Irish physics professor
 John B. McClelland (1734–1782), American Revolutionary War soldier from Pennsylvania
 John Carman McClelland (born 1951), former politician in Ontario, Canada

See also
 John McClellan (disambiguation)
 John McLellan (disambiguation)